Zensei is a publishing company based in Tokyo, Japan, and specialises in books on Seitai.

External links
Official website (Japanese)
Official website – Books in English (English)
Official website – How to order (English)

References

Book publishing companies in Tokyo